Alvaro Pires is a Canadian law professor, currently a Distinguished University Professor and Canada Research Chair in Legal Traditions and Penal Rationality at University of Ottawa.

References

Year of birth missing (living people)
Living people
Academic staff of the University of Ottawa
Canadian lawyers